Aluízio Pinheiro Ferreira (1897-1980) was the first governor of the former Território Federal do Guaporé (nowadays Rondônia). Aluízio Ferreira Stadium is named after him.

References

1897 births
1980 deaths
People from Rondônia
Governors of Rondônia
Rondônia politicians